Mohammad Zahir Shah (Pashto/Dari: , 15 October 1914 – 23 July 2007) was the last king of Afghanistan, reigning from 8 November 1933 until he was deposed on 17 July 1973. Serving for 40 years, Zahir was the longest-serving ruler of Afghanistan since the foundation of the Durrani Empire in the 18th century. He expanded Afghanistan's diplomatic relations with many countries, including with both sides of the Cold War. In the 1950s, Zahir Shah began modernizing the country, culminating in the creation of a new constitution and a constitutional monarchy system. Demonstrating nonpartisanship, his long reign was marked by peace in the country that was lost afterwards, ending in complete politcal conflicts.

In 1973, while Zahir Shah was undergoing medical treatment in Italy, his regime was overthrown in a coup d'état by his cousin and former prime minister, Mohammad Daoud Khan, who established a single-party republic, ending more than 225 years of continuous monarchical government. He remained in exile near Rome until 2002, returning to Afghanistan after the end of the Taliban government. He was given the title Father of the Nation, which he held until his death in 2007.

Family background and early life
Zahir Shah was born on 15 October 1914, in a city quarter called Deh Afghanan in Kabul, Afghanistan. He was the son of Mohammad Nadir Shah (1883–1933) a senior member of the Mohammadzai Royal family and commander in chief of the Royal Afghan Army for former king Amanullah Khan, and of Begum Mah Parwar Begum (d. 1941), a Pashtun tribe woman. Nadir Shah assumed the throne after the execution of the self-proclaimed ruler of Afghanistan Habibullah Kalakani on 1 November 1929. Mohammad Zahir's father, son of Sardar Mohammad Yusuf Khan, was born in Dehradun, British India, his family having been exiled after the Second Anglo-Afghan War. Nadir Shah was a descendant of Sardar Sultan Mohammad Khan Telai, half-brother of Emir Dost Mohammad Khan. His grandfather Mohammad Yahya Khan (father in law of Emir Yaqub Khan) was in charge of the negotiations with the British resulting in the Treaty of Gandamak. After the British invasion after the killing of Sir Louis Cavagnari during 1879, Yaqub Khan, Yahya Khan and his sons Princes Mohammad Yusuf Khan and Mohammad Asef Khan were taken captive by the British and transferred to the British Raj, where they remained forcibly until the two princes were invited back to Afghanistan by Emir Abdur Rahman Khan during the last year of his reign (1901). During the reign of Amir Habibullah they received the title of Companions of the King (Musahiban).

Zahir Shah was educated in a special class for princes at Elementary Primary, built in 1904 by the United Kingdom, and Habibia High School, where many subjects were taught in English. For his secondary education, he went to the Amaniya High School (built during the reign of King Amanullah by France, where many subjects were taught in French. This school was renamed by Nadir Shah as Esteqlal High School) after the fall of King Amanullah. Zahir Shah studied at the Infanterie Military School in the winter (school year in Kabul, 21 March to November). He was then sent to France for further training. He continued his education in France where his father had served as a diplomatic envoy, studying at the Pasteur Institute and the University of Montpellier. When he returned to Afghanistan he helped his father and uncles restore order and reassert government control during a period of lawlessness in the country. He was later enrolled at an Infantry School and appointed a privy counsellor. Zahir Shah served in the government positions of deputy war minister and minister of education.

Last king of Afghanistan

Zahir Khan was proclaimed king (shah) on 8 November 1933 at the age of 19, after the assassination of his father Mohammad Nadir Shah. After his ascension to the throne he was given the regnal title "He who puts his trust in God, follower of the firm religion of Islam". For the first almost thirty years he did not effectively rule, ceding power to his paternal uncles, Mohammad Hashim Khan and Shah Mahmud Khan, both serving as prime ministers. This period fostered a growth in Afghanistan's relations with the international community as during 1934, Afghanistan joined the League of Nations while also receiving formal recognition from the United States. By the end of the 1930s, agreements on foreign assistance and trade had been reached with many countries, most notably with the Axis powers of Germany, Italy, and Japan.

Zahir Shah provided aid, weapons, and Afghan fighters to the Uighur and Kirghiz Muslim rebels who had established the First East Turkestan Republic. The aid was not capable of saving the First East Turkestan Republic, as the Afghan, Uighur, and Kirghiz forces were defeated in 1934 by the Kuomintang Chinese Muslim New 36th Division of the National Revolutionary Army, commanded by General Ma Zhancang at the Battle of Kashgar and Battle of Yarkand. All the Afghan volunteers were killed by the Chinese Muslim troops, who then abolished the First East Turkestan Republic, and reestablished Chinese government control over the area.Despite close relations to the Axis powers, Zahir Shah and his governments refused to take sides during World War II and Afghanistan remained one of the few countries in the world to remain neutral. From 1944 to 1947, Afghanistan experienced a series of revolts by various tribes. After the end of World War II, Zahir Shah recognised the need for the modernisation of Afghanistan and recruited a number of foreign advisers to assist with the process. During this period Afghanistan's first modern university was founded. During his reign a number of potential advances and reforms were derailed as a result of factionalism and political infighting. He also requested financial aid from both the United States and the Soviet Union, and Afghanistan was one of few countries in the world to receive aid from both Cold War adversaries. In a 1969 interview, Zahir Shah said that he is "not a capitalist. But I also don’t want socialism. I don’t want socialism that would bring about the kind of situation [that exists] in Czechoslovakia. I don’t want us to become the servants of Russia or China or the servant of any other place."

He was considered a relatively lenient leader compared to previous kings; Zahir Shah had never signed a warrant for the execution of anyone for political reasons during his reign. He also used his power several times to commute capital punishment sentences given to some convicted criminals.  At Zahir Shah's behest a new constitution was introduced in 1964 which made Afghanistan a modern democratic state by introducing free elections, a parliament, civil and political rights, women's rights, and universal suffrage.

At least five Afghani Pul coins during his reign bore the Arabic title:
المتوكل على الله محمد ظاهر شاه, "AlMutawakkil 'ala Allah Muhammad Zhahir Shah" which means "The leaner on God, Muhammad Zhahir Shah". The title "AlMutawakkil 'ala Allah", "The leaner on God" is taken from Quran 8:61.

By the time he returned to Afghanistan in 2002, Zahir Shah's rule was characterized as a lengthy era of peace.

Exile

In 1973, while Zahir Shah was abroad in Italy, his cousin Mohammad Daoud Khan staged a coup d'état and established an autocratic republican government. As a former Prime Minister, Daoud Khan had been forced to resign by Zahir Shah a decade earlier and felt that Zahir Shah lacked leadership and that the parliamentary system prevented real progressivism. In August 1973, Zahir Shah sent a letter from Rome to Khan in Kabul declaring his abdication, saying he respected "the will of my compatriots" after realizing the people of Afghanistan "with absolute majority welcomed a Republican regime".

Zahir Shah lived in exile in Italy for 29 years alongside his wife Queen Humaira Begum and other royal family members. Initially, they lived in a three‐room apartment on Rome's Via Cassia. Relatives of the 1920s King Amanullah Khan, of the same house of Barakzai, also lived in Rome. President Daoud Khan continued to send money to them in Italy consisting of income from property and estates of the former royal family. After the Saur Revolution, the leftist Khalq government cut all funds to Italy.

Zahir Shah eventually lived in a villa in the affluent community of Olgiata on Via Cassia, north of Rome, where he spent his time playing golf and chess, as well as tending to his garden. He was financially supported by the Shah of Iran since the new Afghan government failed to provide him a monthly salary. The Shah also supported his two sons who were studying in the United States and Canada. He was prohibited from returning to Afghanistan during the late 1970s by the Soviet-assisted Communist government. In 1983 during the Soviet–Afghan War, Zahir Shah was cautiously involved with plans to develop a government in exile. Ultimately these plans failed because he could not reach a consensus with powerful Islamist factions. It has also been reported that Afghanistan, the Soviet Union, and India had all tried to persuade Zahir Shah to return as chief of a neutral, possibly interim, administration in Kabul. Both the Soviet Union and the United States sent representatives to meet him, and President Mohammad Najibullah supported Zahir Shah to play a role in a possible interim government in the quest for peace. In May 1990, Zahir Shah issued a long statement through Voice of America and the BBC calling for unity and peace among Afghans, and offering his services. This reportedly led to a spark of interest and approval among the Kabul populace. However, the idea of a revived political role for Zahir Shah was met with hostility by some, notably radical Islamist Gulbuddin Hekmatyar.

In 1991, Zahir Shah survived an attempt on his life by a knife-wielding assassin masquerading as a Portuguese journalist. After the fall of the pro-Soviet government, Zahir Shah was favored by many to return and restore the monarchy to unify the country as he was acceptable to most factions. However, these efforts were blocked mostly by Pakistan's ISI, who feared his stance on the Durand Line issue. In June 1995, Zahir Shah's former envoy Sardar Wali announced at talks in Islamabad, Pakistan, that Zahir Shah was willing to participate in peace talks to end the Afghan Civil War, but no consensus was ever reached.

Return to Afghanistan

On 18 April 2002, at the age of 87 and four months after the end of Taliban rule, Zahir Shah returned to Afghanistan, flown in on an Italian military plane, and welcomed at Kabul's airport by Hamid Karzai and other officials. His return was widely welcomed by Afghans, and he was liked by all ethnic groups. There were proposals for a return to the monarchy – Zahir Shah himself let it be known that he would accept whatever responsibility was given him by the Loya Jirga, which he initiated in June 2002. However he was obliged to publicly renounce monarchical leadership at the behest of the United States (as the US knew that Pakistan would not accept him as king because they still feared his stance on the Durand Line issue, and allowing him to be restored could result in Pakistan feeling threatened to the point that they would kick out the coalition in Afghanistan and actively support the Taliban) as most of the delegates to the Loya Jirga were prepared to vote for Zahir Shah and block the U.S.-backed Hamid Karzai. While he was prepared to become chief of state he made it known that it would not necessarily be as monarch: "I will accept the responsibility of head of state if that is what the Loya Jirga demands of me, but I have no intention to restore the monarchy. I do not care about the title of king. The people call me Baba and I prefer this title." Karzai called Zahir Shah a "symbol of unity, a very kind man" and a "fatherly figure."

Zahir Shah visited his father's tomb soon after arriving in Kabul and reportedly gasped after witnessing rocket holes and gunfire damage on the tomb caused by the civil war.

Hamid Karzai, who was favored by Zahir Shah, became president of Afghanistan after the Loya Jirga. Karzai, from the Pashtun Popalzai clan, provided Zahir Shah's relatives with major jobs in the transitional government. Following the Loya Jirga he was given the title "Father of the Nation" by Karzai, symbolizing his role in Afghanistan's history as a symbol of national unity. This title ended with his death. In August 2002 he relocated back to the Arg, his old palace, after 29 years.

In an October 2002 visit to France, Zahir Shah slipped in a bathroom, bruising his ribs, and on 21 June 2003, while in France for a medical check-up, he broke his femur.

On 3 February 2004, Zahir Shah was flown from Kabul to New Delhi, India, for medical treatment after complaining of an intestinal problem. He was hospitalized for two weeks and remained in New Delhi under observation. On 18 May 2004, he was brought to a hospital in the United Arab Emirates because of nose bleeding caused by heat.

Zahir Shah attended the 7 December 2004 swearing-in of Hamid Karzai as President of Afghanistan.  During his final years, he was frail and required a microphone pinned to his collar so that his faint voice could be heard. In January 2007, Zahir was reported to be seriously ill and bedridden.

Death 

On 23 July 2007, Zahir Shah died in the compound of the presidential palace in Kabul after a prolonged illness. His death was announced on national television by President Karzai, who said "He was the servant of his people, the friend of his people, he was a very kind person, kind hearted. He believed in the rule of the people and in human rights." His funeral was held on 24 July. It began on the premises of the presidential palace, where politicians and dignitaries paid their respects; his coffin was then taken to a mosque before being moved to the royal mausoleum on Maranjan Hill in eastern Kabul.

Personal life
Zahir Shah was reportedly shy, modest and "soft-spoken". He liked photography, chess, and smoking cigars.

Zahir Shah was fluent in Pashto, Dari (his mother tongue), and could also speak English and perfect French.

To his family, he was known as Baba.

Family

He married his first cousin Humaira Begum (1918–2002) on 7 November 1931 in Kabul. They had six sons and two daughters:

In January 2009, an article by Ahmad Majidyar of the American Enterprise Institute included one of his grandsons, Mustafa Zahir, on a list of fifteen possible candidates in the 2009 Afghan presidential election. However, Mustafa did not become a candidate. His granddaughter, Princess Noal of Afghanistan, is the wife of Muhammad Ali, Prince of the Sa'id, the heir apparent to the abolished thrones of Egypt and Sudan.

Titles and styles

During his reign, His Majesty Mohammad Zahir Shah, King of Afghanistan.

References

External links

 C-SPAN: Afghan King & Queen 1963 Visit to U.S. Reel America Preview (video)
 Mohammad Zahir Shah at the Encyclopædia Britannica
 Zahir Shah: The last king of Afghanistan, Robert Fisk, The Independent
 Profile, The Observer
 
 interviews Zahir Shah videos
 interviews Zahir Shah in written

|-

1914 births
2007 deaths
20th-century Afghan monarchs
Kings of Afghanistan
Barakzai dynasty
Leaders ousted by a coup
World War II political leaders
Afghan Sunni Muslims
Afghan exiles
Afghan expatriates in Italy
Pashtun people
People from Kabul
Habibia High School alumni
Collars of the Order of the White Lion
Grand Cordons of the National Order of the Cedar
Grand Croix of the Légion d'honneur
Grand Crosses Special Class of the Order of Merit of the Federal Republic of Germany
Knights Grand Cross with Collar of the Order of Merit of the Italian Republic
1930s in Afghanistan
1940s in Afghanistan
1950s in Afghanistan
1960s in Afghanistan
1970s in Afghanistan
20th-century Afghan politicians